Whyte & Mackay Ltd is a company producing alcoholic beverages based in Glasgow, Scotland.The company is a subsidiary of Alliance Global Group, one of the largest alcoholic-beverage companies in Southeast Asia.

History

Charles Mackay (1850–1919) and James Whyte founded a company as whisky merchants and bonded warehousemen in Glasgow in 1882. W&M Special was their first blended whisky and it was successful in the United Kingdom and other English speaking countries. After World War II the company focused on the home market and now sell more than 1 million cases a year.

The brand was purchased by Hugh Fraser's SUITS group in 1971. SUITS was acquired by Lonrho in 1981 and subsequently Whyte & Mackay was sold to Brent Walker in 1988 and then to American Brands in 1990, which was renamed as Fortune Brands in 1997. In 2001 Fortune Brands sold Whyte & Mackay to its management for £208 million in a deal part-financed by brothers Robert Tchenguiz and Vincent Tchenguiz and brother-in-law Vivian Imerman and a £190 million loan from German investment bank WestLB. Initially chairman then CEO, Imerman instituted an aggressive cost-cutting programme and bought out 60 shareholder employees before, in 2005, purchasing the remaining interests in the firm with the Tchenguiz brothers. In 2007, they sold the company to Indian-based United Spirits Limited for £595 million (then, USD 1.2 billion).

In August 2013, key members of United Spirits Limited (USL), a subsidiary of United Breweries that owned Whyte & Mackay, resigned from positions at Whyte & Mackay in the wake of the purchase of a controlling share of USL by Diageo, including USL Chairman Vijay Mallya, Whyte & Mackay CEO John Beard, and director Ayani Nedungadi. Regulators in the UK are investigating whether to force United to divest itself of Whyte & Mackay due to anti-trust concerns over Diageo's dominant position in Scotch whisky production. On 16 September 2013, Whyte & Mackay appointed Bryan Donaghey as its new CEO.  Donaghey formerly served as managing director of Diageo for Scotland and prior to Diageo held posts within the Scotch Whisky Association.

Since 31 October 2014, Whyte & Mackay has been owned by Philippines-based Alliance Global Group through the group beverage production arm Emperador Inc ., after being sold by the India-based United Spirits for £430m.

United States
In October 2011, Whyte & Mackay formed an import company in the U.S.—Whyte & Mackay Americas—to handle its portfolio in the U.S. market with products including the Jura, The Dalmore, Cluny, John Barr, Glen Salen, Whyte & Mackay and Mackinlay’s whisky brands, as well as Glayva Liqueur, Snow Leopard and Pinky vodkas in the U.S.  The company appointed former Bacardi executive Jorge Gutierrez as president of Whyte & Mackay Americas.  In July 2013, Gutierrez left Whyte & Mackay Americas to become CEO of Voli Vodka.  In September 2013, Whyte & Mackay appointed alcoholic beverage specialist Park Street to provide importing, back-office and enterprise resource planning services for its Whyte & Mackay Americas unit.

Products

The company sells Single Malt and Blended Scotch whiskies, Liqueurs, and Vodkas.  Their brands include the W&M blends; Dalmore, Jura, and Fettercairn single malts; Glayva liqueur; and Vladivar Vodka.

In August 2010, it was reported that Whyte & Mackay would replicate a supply of whisky discovered in Antarctica from a 1907 expedition of Antarctic explorer Ernest Shackleton's supplies. The 11 bottles of whisky recovered were of the Mackinlay brand, and Whyte and Mackay now oversee those distilleries.

On 14 October 2010, Whyte & Mackay sold two bottles of their 64-year-old Dalmore Trinitas malt whisky for £100,000 each.  According to the master distiller, only three bottles of this whisky were ever made, and it cannot be made again.

Awards
 In 2006, Whyte & Mackay whisky was entered in the 2006 World Quality Awards, organized by Monde Selection, and awarded a Gold Quality Award.

 In 2009, 30-year-old Whyte & Mackay whisky was voted the best blended whisky in the world in two competitions.

 In 2011, Whyte and Mackay whisky won International Wine & Spirits Competition Gold - Best in Class.

 In 2012, White and Mackay whisky won San Francisco Spirits Competition 2012 Gold medal.

 In 2013, 2014 and 2015 Whyte and Mackay whisky won Wine & Spirits Competition Gold medal.

 In 2018 and 2020 White and Mackay whisky won International Spirits Challenge Gold Medal.

Former sports sponsorship

Whyte & Mackay were sponsors of the English football team Leeds United from 2003 to 2006. The brand also formerly sponsored Edinburgh club Hibernian in the Scottish Premier League, the Royal Challengers Bangalore in the Indian Premier League, the PDC Premier League Darts and the Force India Formula One racing team.

As treasure
Bottles of Whyte & Mackay were recovered by underwater archaeologist E. Lee Spence from the shipwreck of the SS Regina, which had been sunk in Lake Huron in 1913. A People magazine article that told of the recovery, had a picture of Spence on the bow of the salvage boat hoisting a full bottle of Whyte and Mackay.

References

External links
Whyte & Mackay official site

Drink companies of Scotland
Manufacturing companies based in Glasgow
Scottish malt whisky
British companies established in 1844
Food and drink companies established in 1844
Food and drink companies based in Glasgow
Scottish brands
1844 establishments in Scotland
Blended Scotch whisky
United Spirits brands